Jerry Lee Carl Jr. (born June 17, 1958) is an American politician and businessman serving as the U.S. representative for Alabama's 1st congressional district since 2021. The district is based in Mobile, and includes all of the state's share of the Gulf Coast. A Republican, Carl served as a member of the Mobile County Commission from 2012 to 2020, the last two years as president of the commission.

In 2019, Carl announced his candidacy for the House seat being vacated by incumbent Republican Bradley Byrne. He defeated former State Senator Bill Hightower in a runoff for the Republican nomination and Democrat James Averhart in the general election.

Early life and education 
A native of Mobile, Alabama, Carl graduated from Sylacauga High School in 1977. He attended Lake City Community College (now Florida Gateway College) for a time, but left to move back to Mobile and start his first business.

Career 
After leaving community college, Carl worked for Alabama Power. He then worked for Burford Equipment Company and as a salesman for various companies in Mobile. In 1989, Carl established Stat Medical, a healthcare equipment business. He later worked as a manager at Rotech Medical before establishing a real estate development firm. Carl founded Carl and Associates, a management group, in 2003. He then started Cricket and Butterfly, LLC, a lumber and timber company.

Carl ran for Mobile County Commission in 2012. He defeated incumbent Mike Dean in the Republican primary election in April, and won the general election in November. He was reelected over Margie Wilcox in 2016. In 2019, Carl was selected to serve as Commission President.

U.S. House of Representatives

Elections

2020 

In June 2020, Carl announced he would run for the 1st district, which was being vacated by seven-term incumbent and fellow Republican Bradley Byrne. He faced former State Senator Bill Hightower, State Representative Chris Pringle, and two others in the Republican primary. Carl narrowly defeated Hightower in the primary, and they went to a runoff election. Carl defeated Democratic nominee James Averhart in the general election with 64.4% of the vote. The 1st has been in Republican hands without interruption since 1965, and the Democrats have only managed 40% of the vote once since then.

The 1st typically gives its incumbents very long tenures in Washington. When Carl took office on January 2, 2021, he became only the seventh person to hold the seat since 1919; all but one of his six predecessors held it for at least 10 years.

2022 

Carl was reelected in 2022.

Tenure

117th Congress (2021–present)
One of Carl's first votes upon joining Congress was opposing the second impeachment of Donald Trump. He said he voted against impeachment because he believed the articles of impeachment "failed to reach the necessary threshold for impeachment." He also called impeachment "Nancy Pelosi's personal vendetta against President Trump." Carl voted against the American Rescue Plan in March 2021, saying the bill was "rushed" too soon after the passing of the Consolidated Appropriations Act, 2021 and that it was too big and would add to the increasing national debt.

As of January 2022, Carl had voted in line with Joe Biden's stated position 8% of the time.

Committee assignments 
 Committee on Armed Services
Subcommittee on Military Personnel
Subcommittee on Seapower and Projection Forces
 Committee on Natural Resources
Subcommittee on Indigenous Peoples of the United States
Subcommittee on Water, Oceans and Wildlife

Caucus memberships 

 Republican Study Committee

Political positions 
Carl is a self-described conservative.

Abortion 
Carl is anti-abortion, saying in a campaign advertisement that "it’s immoral to stop a beating heart". He has similarly promised to "protect the unborn." Carl called Roe v. Wade "disastrous" and supported its overturning in 2022.

Immigration 
Carl supports the Trump wall on the U.S.–Mexico border, saying, "Jerry will stand with Trump, build the wall and end handouts for lawbreaking illegals."

Gun control 
Carl has said, "As a conservative, I'll stop liberals from destroying the Second Amendment." The National Rifle Association's Political Victory Fund endorsed him in 2020, claiming that he supports right to carry legislation.

Impeachment of Donald Trump 
Carl voted against the second impeachment of Donald Trump, and voted to object to Pennsylvania's and Arizona's electors during the 2021 United States Electoral College vote count.

Climate change 
Carl opposed President Joe Biden's moratorium on oil and gas production, claiming it would destroy as many as 24,000 jobs in Alabama.

Vote to overturn 2020 election 
On January 6, 2021, Carl was one of 147 Republican lawmakers who voted to overturn results in the 2020 presidential election.

Electoral history

Personal life 

Carl married Tina in 1981, and they have two children. Carl is a Baptist.

References

External links
 Representative Jerry Carl official U.S. House website
 Rep. Jerry Carl official U.S House twitter
 Jerry Carl for Congress
 
 
 

|-

1958 births
Living people
Baptists from the United States
Baptists from Alabama
Businesspeople from Alabama
Florida Gateway College alumni
People from Mobile, Alabama
Republican Party members of the United States House of Representatives from Alabama